The Apuí Mosaic is a protected area mosaic in the state of Amazonas, Brazil.

Location

The Apuí Mosaic is divided between the municipalities of Apuí (91.85%) and Novo Aripuanã (8.15%) in the state of Amazonas.
The mosaic is accessible by air to Apuí, by land via the BR-230 Trans-Amazonian Highway or by boat via the Madeira River to the city of Novo Aripuanã and then to the conservation units via the Aripuanã River.

The mosaic contains the Guariba and Sucunduri State Parks; Bararati and Aripuanã sustainable development reserves; Guariba Extractive Reserve; and Sucunduri, Aripuanã, Apuí and Manicoré state forests.
These are areas with strong deforestation pressure due to expansion of the agricultural frontier into the Brazilian Amazon.

History

The Apuí Mosaic was created by decree 55 of 12 March 2010 under the responsibility of CEUC in the border region between the states of Amazonas, Mato Grosso and Pará.
The advisory board was created by the same decree.
The management plan was approved on 22 September 2010.
The plan was treated as the plan for each of the nine conservation units as well as for the mosaic as a whole, on the basis that the units represented a pre-zoning of the mosaic into areas with different objectives and types of use.
The integrated plan would help correct errors in delimitation of the units as better information was obtained, and would prevent actions in one unit having negative effect on another unit.

Environment

The mosaic includes terra firma forest, flooded forest, campos rupestres, campina and campinarana.
It contains the headwaters of the Acari and Sucunduri rivers.
The Monte Cristo rapids and the  Falls (Saltos do Rio Sucunduri) are well-known attractions.
The region has more than 13 endemic species of primates.
Surveys of the west of the mosaic have identified 850 tree species, 46 mammals, more than 300 birds, 27 reptiles, 30 amphibians and almost 100 species of fish.

Notes

Sources

2010 establishments in Brazil
Protected area mosaics of Brazil
Protected areas of Amazonas (Brazilian state)